Andreas Hellmann (born 18 April 1952) is a German former swimmer. He competed in two events at the 1972 Summer Olympics.

References

External links
 

1952 births
Living people
German male swimmers
Olympic swimmers of West Germany
Swimmers at the 1972 Summer Olympics
Sportspeople from Augsburg